Your Life Guards or Your Life Regiment is a 1955 West German romantic comedy film directed by Hans Deppe and starring Ingrid Andree, Gerhard Riedmann and Wolf Albach-Retty.

The film's sets were designed by the art director Willi Herrmann and Heinrich Weidemann. It was made using eastmancolor. The film was partly shot on location at Charlottenburg Palace.

Cast

References

Bibliography

External links 
 

1955 films
West German films
German romantic comedy films
1955 romantic comedy films
1950s German-language films
Films directed by Hans Deppe
Films set in Europe
1950s German films